John Farquhar (24 June 1924 – 1 November 2000) was a Scottish footballer who played in the Scottish League for Morton, Queen's Park, Cowdenbeath and Albion Rovers as a forward. He was capped by Great Britain.

Farquhar died in Glasgow on 1 November 2000, at the age of 76.

References 

1924 births
2000 deaths
Scottish footballers
Scottish Football League players
Queen's Park F.C. players
Association football forwards
Footballers from East Ayrshire
Greenock Morton F.C. players
Cowdenbeath F.C. players
Albion Rovers F.C. players